Evlagh More (Irish derived place name, Aibhleach Mór meaning 'The Big Place of Fires' (possibly from lime-burning).) is a townland in the civil parish of Kildallan, barony of Tullyhunco, County Cavan, Ireland.

Geography

Evlagh More is bounded on the west by Evlagh Beg townland, on the east by Aghnacreevy and Drumminnion townlands, on the south by Drumlarah townland and on the north by Cornacrum townland. Its chief geographical features are the Rag River, small streams and forestry plantations. Evlagh More is traversed by minor public roads and rural lanes. The townland covers 139 acres.

History

The 1609 Plantation of Ulster Baronial map depicts the townland as Eyulagh. A Plantation of Ulster grant dated 1611 spells the name as Evelagh. The 1641 Depositions spell the name as Leuella. The 1652 Commonwealth Survey spells the townland as Evlaghmore. The 1665 Down Survey map depicts it as Euelaghmore. William Petty's map of 1685 depicts it as Erelaghmore.

From medieval times up to the early 1600s, the land belonged to the McKiernan Clan.

In the Plantation of Ulster by grant dated 16 August 1611, King James VI and I granted, inter alia, Evelagh to Thomas Jones-Evelagh to Thomas Johnes, gentleman. At Cavan, on 26 July 1642, the aforesaid Thomas Jones and his son William Jones gave the names of rebel leaders in the Cavan Irish Rebellion of 1641, including, inter alia, Laighlen mac Torlough McKernan of Leuella, James mac Laighlen McKernan of same and Hugh mac Laighlen McKernan of same. They also stated- . In a further deposition dated 26 July 1642, the said Thomas Jones of Drumminnion, Kildallan parish stated- .

After the Irish Rebellion of 1641 concluded, the 1652 Commonwealth Survey lists Evlaghmore as belonging to James Thornton. A confirming grant dated 30 January 1668 from King Charles II of England to James Thornton included 1 ½ polls containing 62 acres 1 rood and 8 perches in Evallaghmore.

A marriage settlement dated 7 March 1750 relates to the Faris family with lands in Evlaghmore etc.

In the Cavan Poll Book of 1761, there was one person registered to vote in Evelagh More in the Irish general election, 1761 - George Fairis of Mackan townland. He was entitled to cast two votes. The four election candidates were Charles Coote, 1st Earl of Bellomont and  Lord Newtownbutler (later Brinsley Butler, 2nd Earl of Lanesborough), both of whom were then elected Member of Parliament for Cavan County. The losing candidates were George Montgomery (MP) of Ballyconnell and Barry Maxwell, 1st Earl of Farnham. Absence from the poll book either meant a resident did not vote or more likely was not a freeholder entitled to vote, which would mean most of the inhabitants of Evlagh More.

The 1790 Cavan Carvaghs list spells the name as Eulagh-more.

Ambrose Leet's 1814 Directory spells the name as Evlagh.

The Tithe Applotment Books 1823-1837 list seven tithepayers in the townland.

In 1832 one person in Evelaghmore was registered as a keeper of weapons- Alexander Bothwell who had one sword.

The Evlagh More Valuation Office books are available for May 1838.

On 13 November 1851 the following notice was published- INCUMBERED ESTATES COURT - Thursday, 13th Nov. - The Chief Commissioner sat in the Court, Henrietta-street, Dublin, to-day, for the purpose of selling incumbered property. In the matter of the estates of Williams James Thomas GALBRAITH, owner. Ex parte Morgan CROFTON, petitioner. Lot 1, the house and demesne of Macken, and Drumbinnis, Keilagh, Druminisdill, Drumcartagh, and Drumcannon, county of Cavan, containing £74. 0r. 15p. state measure, held in fee farm, producing a gross annual rental of £484, 11s, 10d., subject to two fee farm rents, one of £131, 18s. 6d., and the other of £62, 6s. 2d. The biddings proceeded from £4000 to £5390, at which sum Mrs. Elizabeth GALBRAITH became the purchaser. Lot 2, the fee simple lands of EVLAGHMORE, containing 140s. 1. 39p. statute measure, and producing an annual rental of £76, 11s, 8d. The first offer was £700., and Mr. W. Galbraith (the owner) was the purchaser for £1000.

Griffith's Valuation of 1857 lists four landholders in the townland.

Census

In the 1901 census of Ireland, there was one family listed in the townland.

In the 1911 census of Ireland, there was one family listed in the townland.

Antiquities

 A lime kiln

References

External links
 The IreAtlas Townland Data Base

Townlands of County Cavan